Invasive Species Act may refer to:
 National Invasive Species Act, a 1996 United States federal law
 North Texas Invasive Species Barrier Act of 2014, a 2014 Texas state law in the United States
 Invasive Species Act (Ontario), a 2015 Ontario provincial law in Canada

See also

 Alien Species Prevention and Enforcement Act of 1992 - a United States federal law
 British Columbia Weed Control Act
 Hazardous Substances and New Organisms Act 1996 of New Zealand

Invasive species